Dĩ An station is a railway station on the North–South railway (Reunification Express) line in Vietnam. It serves the town of Dĩ An in Bình Dương Province.

The Dĩ An railyards were notable as a centre of Union activity in the 1930s, during French Indochina.

References

Buildings and structures in Bình Dương province
Railway stations in Vietnam